The Southern Utah Thunderbirds football (also referred to as the SUU Thunderbirds) program is a college football team that represents Southern Utah University (SUU). With a history dating back to 1963, SUU currently competes in the NCAA Football Championship Subdivision as a member of the ASUN–WAC Football Conference.

The Thunderbirds play their home games on campus at Eccles Coliseum in Cedar City, Utah, and have been led by head coach DeLane Fitzgerald

History
Southern Utah fielded its inaugural team in 1963 with Bruce Osborne as head coach, remained an NAIA independent through 1968, then became a charter member of the Rocky Mountain Athletic Conference (RMAC).

They were an independent for  then became a charter conference member again in 2004 with the Great West Conference (GWC).

In November 2010, Southern Utah announced its admission to the Big Sky Conference, effective 

The Thunderbirds won their first Big Sky championship in 2015, defeating Northern Arizona  in the regular season finale at Cedar City. They had an  regular season, with losses to Utah State, South Dakota State, and Portland State; their eight wins were by mostly large margins. With the success, head coach Ed Lamb joined the staff at Brigham Young in Provo and defensive coordinator Demario Warren 

The Thunderbirds earned the eighth seed in the FCS playoffs; Warren was the conference coach of the year and was a finalist for the Eddie Robinson Coach of the Year Award.

SUU joined the Western Athletic Conference (WAC), already home to regional rival Utah Tech, in 2022. After the 2022 season, the WAC fully merged its football league with that of the ASUN Conference, creating the ASUN–WAC Football Conference, and SUU accordingly moved its football team to the new league.

Football classifications
 1963–1985: National Association of Intercollegiate Athletics
 1986–1992: NCAA Division II
 1993–present: NCAA Division I-AA/FCS

Conference affiliations
 Independent (1963–1968)
 Rocky Mountain Athletic Conference (1969–1985)
 Western Football Conference (1986–1992)
 American West Conference (1993–1995)
 I-AA Independent (1996–2003)
 Great West Conference (2004–2011)
 Big Sky Conference (2012–2021)
 Western Athletic Conference (2022)
 ASUN–WAC Football Conference (2023–present)

Championships

Conference championships

† Co-champions

Division championships

† Co-champions

FCS Playoffs results
The Thunderbirds have appeared in the FCS playoffs three times with an overall record of 0–3.

Head coaches

References

External links
 

 
American football teams established in 1963
1963 establishments in Utah